SITA is a multinational information technology company providing IT and telecommunication services to the air transport industry. The company provides its services to around 400 members and 2,500 customers worldwide, which it claims is about 90% of the world's airline business. Around the world, nearly every passenger flight relies on SITA technology.

History
SITA or Société Internationale de Télécommunications Aéronautiques, was founded in February 1949 by eleven airlines ABB in order to bring about shared infrastructure cost efficiency by combining their communications networks. The eleven original airlines were: British European Airways Corporation (BEAC), British Overseas Airways Corporation (BOAC), British South American Airways (BSAA), KLM, Sabena, Swissair, TWA, Swedish A.G.Aerotransport, Danish Air Lines, Norwegian Air Lines and Air France. SITA was the first company to handle data traffic in real time via a packet switched network over common carrier leased lines.

Expansion
In 1989 computer reservations systems, aerospace manufacturers, tour operators, airfreight forwarders, airport authorities, and other organizations in the air transport industry began joining SITA as members. The company today provides a range of IT solutions as well as infrastructure and communication services for the air transport industry, having evolved from its early days of providing only network-related services.

SITA presently operates in over two hundred countries and territories, and its customers include airlines, airports, airfreight — international freight forwarders, travel and distribution — global distribution systems, governments, aerospace, ground handlers and air traffic control.

SITA is one of the most internationally diverse companies, having a strong local presence in offices spanning the globe, with staff speaking over 60 different languages.

Company structure
SITA is owned by members of the air transport industry, who make up the SITA Board and SITA Council. The company has the remit of working with the air transport community for the benefit of all members. This includes cooperation with industry bodies, such as IATA, ACI and regional associations, aiming to solve common industry issues through the use of IT and telecommunication services, through development of community systems, industry standards and shared infrastructures for aviation. SITA also produces industry surveys including the Air Transport IT Insights, Passenger IT Insights, as well as working jointly with IATA on the industry’s Baggage Report.

SITA FOR AIRCRAFT

Launched in 2005 as OnAir, SITA FOR AIRCRAFT today provides Digital Day of Operations, Cabin Connectivity Services, and Unified Aircraft Communication. OnAir combined with SITA's Aircraft business in 2015 and is now SITA FOR AIRCRAFT but was previously known as SITAONAIR.

Subsidiaries

CHAMP Cargosystems
CHAMP became a fully owned SITA subsidiary at the start of 2022, as an IT company working solely in the air cargo industry, providing services for carriers and distributors. In November 2011, CHAMP acquired TRAXON Europe, an electronic air cargo company, in order to prepare for new International Air Transport Association (IATA) initiatives such as IATA e-freight and Cargo iQ.

In July, 2020, TAP Air Cargo implemented the CHAMP API to further enrich its customer applications. On December 1, 2020, this solution was adopted by Japan Airlines to its cargo management system.

Aviareto
Aviareto is a joint venture between SITA and the Irish government. Aviareto and the International Civil Aviation Organization (ICAO), the Supervisory Authority of the International Registry, agreed that Aviareto would establish and operate the International Registry of Mobile Assets.

Products and services

SITA's portfolio services include:
 Airport operations, including total airport management, safety and security
 Aircraft operations, including operational communications, e-Aircraft services * e.g. for EFBs), and in-flight communications
 Baggage processing
 Cargo operations
 Communications & data exchange
 Passenger processing
 Border management

SITA's shared infrastructures include AirportHub, AirportConnect, CUTE and BagMessage Services, as well as systems for passenger processing.

 support to the MSN ISP: Their internal communication network ( SITA-NET, IP range 57.0.0.0/8 ) was rendered publicly accessible for years by MSN (The Microsoft Network) ISP through the 800 (call for free) phone number which the users were to use to register an MSN account. The IP address which was assigned to the user during the MSN sign-up process was part of the SITA-NET.

Community systems and standards

The community systems provided by SITA for the air transport industry include:
 WorldTracer – baggage tracking
 CUTE : Common Use Terminal Emulator- Common Check-in and Boarding Services for passengers 
 BagMessage – global exchange of IATA-standard baggage messages
 Type B – IATA standard messaging
 iBorders – border management solutions
 Cargo Community System – global electronic data interchange
 PassengerHandler — Multi Departure Control System common agent check-in, bag drop and boarding application

Aiming to simplify communications and processes for air transport, SITA works with around 20 industry bodies and standards committees to set standards. The company has approximately 40 participants in 55 different Standards Setting Working Groups. The organizations SITA works with include IATA, Air Cargo Inc, Airlines for America, ICAO and the FAA, plus AAAE, ACC, Association of European Airlines, CANSO, OpenTravel Alliance,  ITU, the World Customs Organization and the World Trade Organization. The Working Groups SITA is involved in include IATA Type X, IATA Common Use, ATA e-Business, ICAO AFSG, ACI ACRIS and Eurocontrol SWIM. Examples of standards include:
 Messaging (ADS-B, Type X communications, Aero-ID and common-use self-service)
 Traceability (AutoID)
 Transportation security (Border Management data hub)
 Passenger Management (Common Use Passenger Processing System — CUPPS)

Research and development

The company's achievements include:
 First iPad kiosk to sell tickets
 First augmented reality application for an airline
 Social booking and check-in engine on Facebook with deep social network integration
 Managing passenger flow at airports through geo-localization
 In-flight mobile portal developed with OnAir
 World's smallest full-function check-in kiosk 
 First passenger bag-drop solution (which allows a single bag-drop counter to be used to service passengers from multiple airlines)
 CUPPS (Common Use Passenger Processing System) technology, a replacement for the CUTE (Common Use Terminal Equipment) check-in and boarding standard used today. SITA worked with IATA and other bodies to introduce this capability, which will save the air transport industry millions of dollars.
 First service provider to achieve CUPPS compliance certification and to successfully complete its CUPPS pilot program.
 SITA works with business partner Orange Business Services on joint projects, and is also involved with the industry research programs e-Cab, Total Airport, SWIM, and SESAR. Additionally, the company focuses on institutional and academic research through teams at MIT, Cambridge and Montreal Universities.

Carbon goals
 In 2021, SITA became a certified CarbonNeutral company in accordance with The CarbonNeutral Protocol – the leading global standard for carbon neutral programs.  In 2022, SITA announced its commitment to setting science-based emission reduction targets aligned to the Science Based Targets initiative Net-Zero Standard.

References

External links 
 SITA - Official website
 

Business services companies established in 1949
Swiss companies established in 1949